This is an incomplete list of notable reefs.

Reefs

See also
Fringing reef
Recreational dive sites
Recreational diving
Southeast Asian coral reefs
The Structure and Distribution of Coral Reefs

References